Alexandra Nicks (born December 2, 1993), better known as OMB Bloodbath is an American rapper from Houston. She is currently signed to Love Renaissance (LVRN) and Interscope Records.

Career
OMB Bloodbath started making music in the vibrant Houston underground scene with the release of scathing freestyle videos. This helped her build a loyal fanbase. She went viral when she partook in the #SogoneChallenge, a challenge where people rapped over Monica's "So Gone" instrumental, a song from Monica's fourth studio album "After The Storm". On the 4th of May 2020, OMB Bloodbath got her big break when she signed a record deal with Interscope Records in partnership with 10:22PM and Love Renaissance (LVRN). Days after her record deal, she released the Maxo Kream assisted "Dropout".

Discography

Albums
Nothing but the Moon (2017)
Nothing but the Moon 2 (2018)
Nothing but the Moon 3 (2019)
A few forevers (2019)

Singles and EPs
Remedies To Infinity EP (2022)
Blood Sample (2021)
Aye BB (2020)
Dropout (2020)
My Body (2019)
Peanut Butter (2019)
Could've Been (2019)
All I Know (2018)
Let Go (2018)

References

1993 births
Living people
African-American songwriters
Interscope Records artists
Rappers from Houston
Southern hip hop musicians
Musicians from Houston
American women rappers
21st-century American rappers
21st-century American women musicians
21st-century women rappers
American women hip hop musicians
African-American women rappers
21st-century African-American women
21st-century African-American musicians